Omerville is a commune in the Val-d'Oise department and Île-de-France region of France.

Geography

The commune is located approximately 56 km from Paris.

See also
Communes of the Val-d'Oise department

References

External links

Association of Mayors of the Val d'Oise 

Communes of Val-d'Oise